Boundary Creek is a stream in Madera County, California, in the United States.

Boundary Creek was likely named from its location in Madera County near the Mono County line.

See also
List of rivers of California

References

Rivers of Madera County, California
Rivers of Northern California